Pseudodicliptera is a genus of flowering plants belonging to the family Acanthaceae.

Its native range is Madagascar.

Species:

Pseudodicliptera coursii 
Pseudodicliptera humilis 
Pseudodicliptera longifolia 
Pseudodicliptera sulfureolilacina

References

Acanthaceae
Acanthaceae genera